Chendol is a small genus of spineless eels native to Southeast Asia.

Species
There are currently two recognized species in this genus:
 Chendol keelini Kottelat & K. K. P. Lim, 1994
 Chendol lubricus Kottelat & K. K. P. Lim, 1994

References

Chaudhuriidae